The Angelo State Rams, also known as ASU Rams, are the athletic teams that represent Angelo State University, located in San Angelo, Texas, in intercollegiate sports at the Division II level of the National Collegiate Athletic Association (NCAA), primarily competing in the Lone Star Conference (LSC) since the 1968–69 academic year. Prior to becoming a four-year institution, the Rams previously competed in the National Junior College Athletic Association (NJCAA) until after the 1963–64 academic year. The women's teams are the Rambelles.

Angelo State competes in 13 intercollegiate varsity sports: Men's sports include baseball, basketball, cross country, football and track & field; while women's sports include basketball, cross country, golf, soccer, softball, soccer, tennis, track & field and volleyball.

Accomplishments 
Men's basketball
 1957 Rams NJCAA National Championship

Football
 1978 Rams NAIA Division I National Championship

Softball
 2004 Rambelles NCAA Division II National Championship

Track & field
 2010 Rambelles NCAA Division II National Championship

Individual sports

Baseball

The Rams Baseball team plays at Foster Field. Built in 1999 The $4.5m field features 4,200 permanent seats making it the largest on campus Baseball stadium in NCAA Division II. The on campus field was shared with the local minor league San Angelo Colts.

Basketball

The Rams' and Rambelles' basketball teams, as well as the Rambelles' volleyball team, play at Stephens Arena located inside the Junell Center. The arena accommodates audiences of up to 6,500, the fourth largest in all NCAA Division II athletics, and features a 9x12 foot video screen, the largest of its kind in the Lone Star Conference.

Football

The Rams football team plays its home games at LeGrand Stadium at 1st Community Credit Union Field located behind the Junell Center. The rams football team moved there starting with the 2014 season and play their home games on campus for the first time in the school's history.

Softball
The Rambelles softball field, Mayer Field, was completed in 2001. The field features two dugout facilities that include team bathrooms and washrooms, team benches, bag and bat storage areas. The field also includes a pressbox overlooking home plate with seating for six, a concession stand as well as a complete sound and public address system and a deluxe inning-by-inning scoreboard and a mini-athletic training facility with an area for pre-game preparation and injury treatment at the field. The softball field was updated in 2015 adding more seating.

Track & field
The Rams track and field team compete at the LeGrand Sports Complex. The complex features a 400-meter all-weather track with 200-meter straightaway, throwing areas, full press box facilities and seating for 3,000 people. The facility has been the site for the 1988, 1991, 1992, 2002 and 2009 NCAA Division II Outdoor Track and Field Championships.

References

External links